Government Nizamia General Hospital popularly known as Government Unani Hospital is a public hospital located in Hyderabad, Telangana, India. It is a hospital for general medicine and Unani medicine. It was established during the reign of Nizams. It is located near the historic building of Charminar.

History

Nizamia General Hospital was built in 1345 Hijri which is gregorian 1926 by the last Nizam of Hyderabad - HEH Mir Osman Ali Khan.

Hospital
The departments at the hospital include Gynaecology, Surgery, Dentistry, Ophthalmology and Pathology.
It provides Unani medicine services in Bell's palsy, functional neurological disorders, viral Hepatitis renal calculi, nephritis, pyelonephritis, diabetes, diabetic ulcers, sinusitis, bronchial asthma, obesity, haemorrhoid, Fistula-in-ano, chronic non-specific ulcers, skin diseases, sexual problems and diseases belongs to genealogical disorders.

A medical college, Government Nizamia Tibbi College is located on the campus.

See also 
Government Nizamia Tibbi College
Healthcare in India
List of hospitals in India

References

External links

Hospital buildings completed in 1938
Heritage structures in Hyderabad, India
Hospitals in Hyderabad, India
Unani medicine organisations
Establishments in Hyderabad State
Hospitals established in Hyderabad State
20th-century architecture in India